The Government of Goa is a state government created by the Constitution of India and has executive, legislative and judicial authority of the state of Goa. It is headquartered in Panaji, the capital city of Goa.

History
The governor's role is largely ceremonial but plays a crucial role when it comes to deciding who should form the next government or suspending the legislature as has happened in the recent past. After having stable governance for nearly thirty years up to 1990, Goa is now notorious for its political instability having seen fourteen governments in the span of the fifteen years between 1990 and 2005. In March 2005, the assembly was dissolved by the governor and President's rule was declared, which suspended the legislature. A by-election in June 2005 saw the Congress coming back to power after winning three of the five seats that went to the polls. The Indian National Congress (INC) and the Bharatiya Janata Party (BJP) are the two largest parties in the state. In the assembly pole of 2007, a Congress-led coalition won and started ruling the state. Other parties include the United Goans Democratic Party, the Nationalist Congress Party and the Maharashtrawadi Gomantak Party.

In the 2012 election, the Bharatiya Janata Party (BJP) defeated the Indian National Congress government in Goa, led by CM Digambar Kamat. The election was won by the BJP-Maharashtrawadi Gomantak alliance which won 24 seats in the 40-seat assembly. The Bharatiya Janata Party won 21 seats, while the Maharashtrawadi Gomantak Party won 3 seats. Manohar Parrikar, leader of the BJP, was sworn in as Chief Minister of Goa on 9 March 2012. After Parrikar died from cancer in March 2019, he was succeeded by Pramod Sawant as the CM.

Head Leaders

Executive branches

Governor

Goa Council of Ministers

Legislative branch

Administrative and Political divisions

Administrative
Districts of Goa
Talukas of Goa
List of cities and towns in Goa

Political
List of constituencies of Goa Legislative Assembly
North Goa (Lok Sabha constituency)
South Goa (Lok Sabha constituency)

State insignias

Elections

Politics

See also 
 Pramod Sawant ministry
 Third Parrikar ministry
 Parsekar ministry
 Second Parrikar ministry
 Kamat ministry
 Fifth Pratapsingh Rane ministry
 First Parrikar ministry
 Sardinha ministry

Notes

References

External links